Lange may refer to:

People
Lange (surname), a German surname
Lange (musician) (born 1974), British DJ
Lange (Brazilian footballer) (born 1966), Brazilian footballer

Companies
 Lange (ski boots), a producer of ski boots used in alpine (downhill) skiing
 Lange Aviation, manufacturer of gliders
 Lange Textbooks, an imprint of McGraw-Hill Education
 A. Lange & Söhne, watchmakers

Places
 Lange (crater), a crater on Mercury
 Lange Island, Bastian Islands
 Lange Peak, Antarctica
 Lange, Estonia, village in Haaslava Parish, Tartu County, Estonia
 Lange, Western Australia
 Langhe, a region in Piedmont, Italy
 Lange, a tributary of the Oker in Germany
 Lange Eylant, the Dutch term for Long Island

See also
Lang (disambiguation)
Laing (disambiguation)